Formyl cyanide is a simple organic compound with the formula HCOCN and structure . It is simultaneously a nitrile and an aldehyde. Formyl cyanide is the simplest member of the acyl cyanide family. It is known to occur in space in the Sgr B2 molecular cloud.

Production
Formyl cyanide was first made by heating methoxyacetonitrile at 600 °C. Formyl cyanide can also be made by heating cinnamyloxyacetonitrile or allyloxyacetonitrile.

In molecular clouds, formation of formyl cyanide is speculated to result from formaldehyde and the cyanide radical:
CH2O{} + CN^\bullet -> HCOCN{} + H^\bullet

In Earth's atmosphere, the pollutant acrylonitrile reacts with hydroxyl radical forming formyl cyanide, hydroperoxyl and formaldehyde:
CH2=CHCN{} + OH^\bullet{} + 3/2 O2 -> HO2{} + HCOCN{} + CH2O

Reactions
Formyl cyanide reacts with water to form formic acid and hydrogen cyanide.

Related
By formally substituting the hydrogen atom, cyanoformyl chloride, ClC(O)CN, and cyanoformyl bromide, BrC(O)CN are obtained.

References

Acyl cyanides
Nitriles